Ramzi Haziq bin Mohamad (born 23 December 1994) is a Malaysian footballer who plays for Malaysian club Melaka United as a midfielder. Ramzi nicknamed Rameji Jasin can be described as one of the best midfielder in his era. His tough training with Janmal Jasin now fruitful as out of 14 League Super Matches, the most goal assist belong to him.

In 2014, Ramzi played for Harimau Muda B in Singaporean S.League.

References

External links
 

1994 births
Living people
Malaysian footballers
Johor Darul Ta'zim F.C. players
Melaka United F.C. players
Malaysia Super League players
Malaysia Premier League players
Association football midfielders
People from Malacca